Tel Hazor, also Chatsôr, translated in LXX as Hasōr, identified at Tell Waqqas / Tell Qedah el-Gul, is an archaeological tell at the site of ancient Hazor, located in Israel, Upper Galilee, north of the Sea of Galilee, in the northern Korazim Plateau. In the Middle Bronze Age (around 1750 BCE) and the Israelite period (ninth century BCE), Hazor was the largest fortified city in the country and one of the most important in the Fertile Crescent. It maintained commercial ties with Babylon and Syria, and imported large quantities of tin for the bronze industry. In the Book of Joshua, Hazor is described as “the head of all those kingdoms” (Josh. 11:10). Though some scholars do not consider the Book of Joshua to be historically accurate, archaeological excavations have emphasized its importance.

The Hazor expedition headed by Yigal Yadin in the mid-1950s was the most important dig undertaken by Israel in its early years of statehood. Tel Hazor is the largest archaeological site in northern Israel, featuring an upper tell of 30 acres and a lower city of more than 175 acres.

In 2005, the remains of Hazor were designated a World Heritage Site by UNESCO as part of the Biblical Tels - Megiddo, Hazor, Beer Sheba.

Excavations

The upper mound has a height of about 40 meters. Initial soundings were carried out by John Garstang in 1926.

Major excavations were conducted for four seasons from 1955 to 1958 by a Hebrew University team led by  Yigael Yadin.
Yadin returned to Hazor for a final season of excavation in 1968. The excavations were supported by James A. de Rothschild, and were published in a dedicated five volume set of books by the Israel Exploration Society.

Excavation at the site by Hebrew University, joined by the Complutense University of Madrid, resumed in 1990 under Amnon Ben-Tor. Those excavations continue to the present. The work from 1990 to 2012 is detailed in two IEF books.

In the 2010 excavation season, two cuneiform tablet fragments, made of local clay, were discovered dating to the Old Babylonian period of the Middle Bronze Age. The 2nd fragment is small, containing only 7 signs. They are inscribed with laws in the style of Hammurabi's Code, the Laws of Eshnunna, the Book of Exodus, and Hittite laws, seven in total. The fragments include laws pertaining to body parts and damages including those of slaves.

The 2013 excavation season involved the Late Bronze Age (LBA) area M-East, and M-West. M-East included small elements of MBA and represented a major destruction event with extensive burning. In the 2014 and 2015 seasons the Iron Age II thru 8th century BCE layer of area M3  and the Iron age M4 area were worked. A number of unbaked loom weights were found there.  The excavation of 2016 was in the LBA administrative palace destruction layer of area M3. Finds included fragments of an Egyptian statue. The 10 century BCE standing stone complex and 9th century BCE fortifications, built on top of the LBA destruction layer, were also further explored. In 2017 excavation work concentrated in the LBA M3 area containing an administrative palace with a basalt monumental entrance stair. Work also continued on the Iron Age II fortifications. In the 2018 excavation season, the 29th season, from June to July 2018, areas worked were the LBA M3, the 8th century BCE and Persian M4, and the 8th and 10th century BC M68. In the 2019 season, the 13th of the current excavation, areas M4 and M68 were worked, both Iron Age.

In total, Hazor has provided more cuneiform tablets than any other site in the Southern Levant. They fall into two groups. Those from the Middle Bronze period are in standard Old Babylonian Akkadian language while those from the Late Bronze Age are in a local dialect typical of New Kingdom Egyptian times.

Finds from the dig are housed in a museum at Kibbutz Ayelet HaShahar. In 2008, some artifacts in the museum were damaged in an earthquake.

Chronology
This table lists the strata (layers) of ruined settlements that accumulated to form Tel Hazor according to Hazor archeologist Sharon Zuckerman. The shades represent the different archeological periods: Bronze Age, Iron Age, Persian period and Hellenistic period. Some layers are associated with the content of contemporary historical sources.

In a recent article (2021), Israel Finkelstein, quoting his past articles regarding stratum X in Tel Hazor (shown in the table above), commonly attributed to Solomon, states:  

Finkelstein's Low Chronology is disputed by other archaeologists, such as William G. Dever, who considers that although the “larger-than-life” portrait of the Bible is exaggerated, Judah was a centralized kingdom around 10th century BCE and likely ruled by Solomon. The conventional date of stratum X in the 10th century is also supported by Amnon Ben-Tor and Shlomit Bechar, the chief excavators at the site. A more nuanced position is held by Avraham Faust et al. (2021), who consider the chronological difference between Finkelstein and his opponents was already narrowed when he agreed that "not only the Iron Age IIA, but perhaps even the late Iron Age IIA, started already in the 10th century", but that most scholars have instead adopted various versions of the traditional, or modified, chronology.

Among scholars who support Finkelstein's Low chronology, regarding Tel Hazor's stratum X, is Merja Alanne, which in her (2017) Doctoral dissertation, quoting late Dr. Orna Zimhoni's work (1997), writes:

History

Early Bronze Age
The first settlement excavated in Tel Hazor is dated to the Early Bronze Age II and III periods, existing at around the 28th and 24th centuries BCE. It was part of a system of settlements around the Hula Valley, including Abel Beth Maachah, Dan and Kedesh. The settlement was exposed in limited areas where a few houses were discovered. Based on these finds, Early Bronze Age Hazor was not a significant settlement. With that said, it seems that a large monumental structure dated to the following Middle Bronze Age period was already erected in the Early Bronze Age, sometime after the 27th century BCE. If this is true it implies that already in its beginnings, Hazor was a well-planned settlement that served as an urban center. It also shows one of the earliest examples of Basalt slabs used as foundations to walls (Orthostates) in the Southern Levant, only preceded by a temple from Tel Megiddo. The transition to the Early Bronze Age III period is characterized by the movement of people from rural areas within the valley to major urban sites such as Hazor, Dan and Abel Beth Maachah. Thus the establishment of a possible palace in Hazor, as well as in Dan, attest to this phenomenon.

A large part of Hazor's pottery from that time belongs to the Khirbet Kerak type. A petrographic study of these vessels has shown that they were made with local clays and that Hazor played a key role in distributing them across the country. The study also showed that other types of pottery were made of a different source of local clay. This use of two different local clays for two different families of vessels might indicate a technical decision or otherwise the presence of two or more workshops. One theory suggests that the manufacturers of the Khirbet Kerak tools, which were introduced to the settlement, chose or were forced to use a different source of clay, not controlled by the other workshops. Noteworthy is the discovery of 15 cylinder seal impressions on pottery from this period, added to another found some 2 kilometers south. This assemblage is one of the largest in the southern Levant and the fact it was found in such a small excavation area further supports the reconstruction of Hazor as an important city during this period.

Intermediate Bronze Age
This period, at the end of the 3rd millennium BCE, is a period of urban decline, separating the Early Bronze Age, which is the Levant's first urban era, from the re-urbanization of the region in the Middle Bronze Age. Throughout the country, most cities were abandoned and archaeologists found mainly small agricultural villages and tombs. Hazor is one of the few exceptions. Remains of several structures from this period were discovered on the site reveal that Hazor was indeed settled in this period. A large amount of pottery belonging to the Megiddo Ware family was discovered in the site and forms the largest assemblage of this kind in the southern Levant. Also, a large amount of copper ingots were collected. These two discoveries might shed light on pottery and metal industries that existed in Hazor during this period, proving its regional importance during this period of decline.

Middle Bronze Age
During the Middle Bronze IIA (MBIIA; 1820-1550), Hazor was a vassal of Ishi-Addu of Qatna.

Execration Texts
In Egypt, Hazor is mentioned in the Execration texts.

Mari Archive
At Mari (Syria), on the Euphrates River, letters mention Hazor during the reigns of Yasmah-Adad and Zimri-Lim(1775-1761 BC). Hazor is part of a trade route Hazor-Qatna-Mari. A tablet fragment was also found at Hazor which listed an expected trade path from Hazor to Mari and then on to Ekallatum.

Late Bronze Age

During the Egyptian Second Intermediate Period and early New Kingdoms (together running between 18th century BCE and 13th century BCE), Canaan was an Egyptian vassal state; thus 14th century documents, from the El Amarna archive in Egypt, describe the king of Hazor (in Amarna letters called Hasura), Abdi-Tirshi, as swearing loyalty to the Egyptian pharaoh. 

According to the Book of Joshua, Hazor was the seat of Jabin, a powerful Canaanite king who led a Canaanite confederation against Joshua, but was defeated by Joshua, who burnt Hazor to the ground. According to the Book of Judges, Hazor was the seat of Jabin, the king of Canaan, whose commander, Sisera, led a Canaanite army against Barak, but was ultimately defeated. Textual scholars believe that the prose account of Barak, which differs from the poetic account in the Song of Deborah, is a conflation of accounts of two separate events, one concerning Barak and Sisera like the poetic account, the other concerning Jabin's confederation and defeat. In addition, the Book of Judges and Book of Joshua may be parallel accounts referring to the same events, rather than describing different time periods, and thus they may refer to the same Jabin, a powerful king based in Hazor, whose Canaanite confederation was defeated by an Israelite army.

Israel Finkelstein claims that the Israelites emerged as a subculture within Canaanite society and rejects the biblical account of the Israelite conquest of Canaan. In this view, the Book of Joshua conflates several independent battles between disparate groups over the centuries, and artificially attributes them to a single leader, Joshua. One archaeological stratum dating from around 1200 BCE shows signs of catastrophic fire, and cuneiform tablets found at the site refer to monarchs named Ibni Addi, where Ibni may be the etymological origin of Yavin (Jabin). The city also show signs of having been a magnificent Canaanite city prior to its destruction, with great temples and opulent palaces, split into an upper acropolis, and lower city; the town evidently had been a major Canaanite city. He theorized that the destruction of Hazor was the result of civil strife, attacks by the Sea Peoples, and/or a result of the general collapse of civilization across the whole Eastern Mediterranean in the Late Bronze Age.

Amnon Ben-Tor of the Hebrew University of Jerusalem believes that recently unearthed evidence of violent destruction by burning verifies the Biblical account. In 2012, a team led Ben-Tor and Sharon Zuckerman discovered a scorched palace from the 13th century BCE in whose storerooms they found 3,400-year-old ewers holding burned crops; Sharon Zuckerman did not agree with Ben-Tor's theory, and claimed that the burning was the result of the city's numerous factions opposing each other with excessive force. More recently, Shlomit Bechar holds that a complex of cultic standing stones (matzebot) from the Iron I and Iron II was built to commemorate the Israelite conquest of the city. She writes that, whether the Israelites did destroy Hazor or not, this complex shows that the conquest tradition probably emerged at an early date.

There had been claims by Christian polemicists that an artifact found at Hazor is that of "Allah, the moon god".

Israelite Hazor

The archaeological remains suggest that after its destruction, the city of Hazor was rebuilt as a minor village within "the territory of Naphtali" (Joshua 19:36). According to the Books of Kings, the town, along with Megiddo, and Gezer, was substantially fortified and expanded by Solomon. Like  Megiddo and Gezer, the remains at Hazor show that during the Early Iron Age the town gained a highly distinctive six chambered gate, as well as a characteristic style to its administration buildings; archaeologists determined that these constructions at Hazor were built by the same leadership as those at Megiddo and Gezer.  Many archaeologists conclude that they were constructed in the tenth century by King Solomon; others date these structures to the early 9th century BCE, during the reign of the Omrides.

Yigael Yadin, one of the earliest archaeologists to work on the site, saw certain features as clearly being Omride; Megiddo, Gezer, and Hazor, all feature deep rock cut pits, from the base of which were rock cut tunnels leading to a well that reached the water table, as water-supply systems, which Yadin attributed to the rule of Ahab; Yadin also attributed to Ahab a citadel, measuring 25 x 21 m, with two-meter thick walls, which was erected in the western part of Hazor. It has been claimed that Yadin's dating was based on the assumption that the layer connected with the gates and administration buildings were built by Solomon.

Archaeological remains indicate that towards the later half of the 9th century BCE, when the king of Israel was Jehu, Hazor fell into the control of Aram Damascus. Some archaeologists suspect that subsequent to this conquest Hazor was rebuilt by Aram, probably as an Aramaean city. When the Assyrians later defeated the Aramaeans, Hazor seemingly returned to Israelite control; Assyrian records indicate that Joash, king of Israel at the time, had paid tribute to Assyria and Israel had become an Assyrian vassal state. Subsequently, the town, along with the remainder of the kingdom of Israel, entered a period of great prosperity, particularly during the rule of Jeroboam II. Some archaeologists attribute the later large scale constructions at Hazor, Megiddo, and Gezer, including the rock cut water supply systems, to this era.

Israel's attempted rebellion against Assyrian domination resulted in an invasion by the forces of the Assyrian ruler, Tiglath-Pileser III; the evidence on the ground suggests that hasty attempts were made to reinforce the defenses of Hazor. Despite the defences, in 732 BCE Hazor was captured, its population deported, and the city was burnt to the ground.

See also
Archaeology of Israel
Cities of the ancient Near East
Early Israelite campaigns
National parks and nature reserves of Israel

References

Further reading
Ruhama Bonfil and Anabel Zarzecki-Peleg, The Palace in the Upper City of Hazor as an Expression of a Syrian Architectural Paradigm, Bulletin of the American Schools of Oriental Research, no. 348, pp. 25–47, Nov 2007
Ruhama Bonfil, Coming before the King—A Ceremonial Basin in Hazor’s Throne Room. Eretz-Israel 30 (Amnon Ben-Tor Volume): 59–72 (Hebrew), 145*–46* (English summary).  
 Zarzecki-Peleg, A and Bonfil, R. (2011) A Syrian City-State in Mitanni’s Orbit? Ugarit-Forschungen 43: 537-567
Yadin Yigael and Et Al. Yadin, Hazor I : An Account of the First Season of Excavations, 1955, Magnes Press, 1958
Yadin Yigael, Hazor II: An Account of the Second Season of Excavations, 1956 [James A. De Rothschild Expedition at Hazor], Oxford University Press, 1961, 
Yadin Yigael, Hazor III - IV. An Account of the Third and Fourth Seasons of Excavations, 1957–1958. The James A. De Rothschild Expedition at Hazor, Biblical Archaeology Society, 1989, 
A. Ben Tor and Robert Bonfil, Hazor: v. 5: The James A De Rothschild Expedition at Hazor (Ancient synagogues studies), Israel Exploration Society, 1997, 
Yadin Yigael, Hazor (Schweich Lectures on Biblical Archaeology), British Academy, 1972, 
Yadin Yigael, Hazor: Rediscovery of a Great Citadel of the Bible, Littlehampton, 1975, 
Schulamit Geva, Hazor, Israel (British Archaeological Reports (BAR)), BAR, 1989, 
S. Zuckerman, Where is the Archive of Hazor Buried?, Biblical Archaeology Review, vol. 32, pp. 28–37, 2006
S. Zuckerman, "'...Slaying oxen and Killing Sheep, Eating Flesh and Drinking Wine...': Feasting in Late Bronze Age Hazor," Palestine Exploration Quarterly, 139,3 (2007), 186-204.
Zarzecki-Peleg, A and Bonfil, R. (2011) A Syrian City-State in Mitanni’s Orbit? Ugarit-Forschungen 43: 537-567
Bonfil R. and Zarzecki-Peleg A., 2022, The iron which the king, my lord, gave to the smiths for work”: Aspects of Authority and Prestige in the City Plan of Hazor Stratum VIII. in U. Davidovich, N. Yahalom-Mack & S. Matskevich (eds.), Material, Method, and Meaning: Papers in Eastern Mediterranean Archaeology in Honor of Ilan Sharon, Ägypten und Altes Testament , vol. 110 , Zaphon, Münster, pp. 313-335

External links

 The Hazor Excavations Project  - Hebrew University of Jerusalem
"Yadin photographs & footage of the excavations"
 The Hazor Excavation Reports  - Hebrew University of Jerusalem
 UNESCO World Heritage site for Hazor

 
Populated places established in the 3rd millennium BC
Populated places disestablished in the 8th century BC
Razed cities
Upper Galilee
Land of Israel
Bronze Age sites in Israel
World Heritage Sites in Israel
National parks of Israel
Amarna letters locations
Canaanite cities
Former populated places in Israel
Buildings and structures in Northern District (Israel)
Bronze Age palaces in Israel
Tells (archaeology)
Omrides
Book of Joshua
Book of Judges